Augusta Krook (31 October 1853 — 27 June 1941) was a Finnish politician and teacher. She served as a Member of the Parliament of Finland in 1909-1910, representing the Swedish People's Party.

Krook's father was General , and her mother Elisabeth  Collan.

She studied at a private German-speaking school, and went on to qualify as a teacher of languages. She worked as a teacher and later headmistress for 40 years, first in Helsinki and later in Vaasa.

Krook was one of the founders of the women's paramilitary Lotta Svärd organisation, and founded in 1919 its first local chapter, in Helsinki. She was also a board director of the Martha organisation.

References

Members of the Parliament of Finland (1909–10)
Swedish People's Party of Finland politicians
Swedish-speaking Finns
People from Helsinki
1853 births
1941 deaths
School principals and headteachers